Assaulting, kidnapping, and assassinating the government officials of the United States, their families, and foreign dignitaries and official guests, is a crime under various statutes, including  (Assaulting, resisting, or impeding certain officers or employees),  (Protection of foreign officials, official guests, and internationally protected persons),  (Influencing, impeding, or retaliating against a Federal official by threatening or injuring a family member),  (Congressional, Cabinet, and Supreme Court assassination, kidnapping, and assault), and  (Presidential and Presidential staff assassination, kidnapping, and assault). Senator Robert Byrd stated, in introducing the bill that became 18 U.S.C. 351, "This legislation is needed to protect representative democracy. Passage would help guarantee the right of any Member of Congress to fulfill his constitutional duties and responsibilities as an elected official of our country." Until 1982, the legislation was silent as to the court's reach, but now it has been clarified that the court has extraterritorial jurisdiction over these offenses.

Minor assault or simple assault is usually punished as a misdemeanor with a base offense level of 4. When physical contact occurs or a deadly weapon is possessed and threatened, it typically escalates to a felony with a higher offense level, and when injury occurs, the penalties increase still further. When there was intent to commit murder, still higher penalties apply. Life imprisonment or the death penalty applies in cases of successful murder. Major penalties apply to kidnapping.

See also

Threatening the president of the United States
Threatening the government officials of the United States
Threatening terrorism against the United States
List of United States presidential assassination attempts and plots

References

Political crimes
United States federal criminal law